The East Turkestan People's Revolutionary Party was a Uyghur communist party and armed separatist group in Xinjiang. It was founded in 1969 or earlier during Mao Zedong's Cultural Revolution, and was the largest armed separatist group in the Xinjiang conflict before its dissolution in 1989.

The ETPRP's goal was to initiate a second "Revolution of the Three Districts" to establish an independent Marxist–Leninist Uyghur state in the Xinjiang region, with help from the Soviet Union. Support from the Soviets increased during the Sino-Soviet split and subsequent border dispute.

History
The ETPRP was founded in 1969 or earlier in Xinjiang, China. It was made up of mainly Uyghurs, but also had a small number of Kazakh fighters. According to Chinese historian Zhang Yuxi, the ETPRP may have been established secretly in 1963. Former members of the ETPRP claimed that the party had around 60,000 members and 178 underground branches in 1969; however, this had not been verified by a third-party.

After a failed insurrection in 1969, the ETPRP gradually weakened due to the arrests of most of their armed fighters after a failed insurrection and many of their members going into exile. The ETPRP blamed the Soviets for their "lack of commitment" to their cause. The party disbanded in 1989.

References

1969 establishments in China
1989 disestablishments in China
Banned communist parties
Banned political parties in China
China–Soviet Union relations
Communist parties in China
Defunct communist militant groups
Defunct communist parties
East Turkestan independence movement
Indigenist political parties
National liberation armies
Political parties disestablished in 1989
Political parties established in 1969
Pro-independence parties